Fattahabad (also Romanized as Fattāḩābād; also known as Fatḩābād) is a village in Mirbag-e Shomali Rural District, in the Central District of Delfan County, Lorestan Province, Iran. At the 2006 census, its population was 501, in 111 families.

References 

Towns and villages in Delfan County